This is a list of Utah Utes football players in the NFL Draft.

Key

Selections

References

Utah

Utah Utes in the NFL